Dominik Thalhammer (born 2 October 1970) is an Austrian football manager. and He is the currently manager of Belgian Pro League club Oostende.

References

External links
 

1970 births
Living people
Austrian football managers
FC Admira Wacker Mödling managers
Wiener Sport-Club managers
Austria women's national football team managers
LASK managers
Floridsdorfer AC managers
Cercle Brugge K.S.V. managers
K.V. Oostende managers
Belgian Pro League managers
Austrian Football Bundesliga managers
Austrian expatriate football managers
Expatriate football managers in Belgium
Austrian expatriate sportspeople in Belgium